I Set My Friends on Fire (often abbreviated as ISMFOF) is an experimental rock band from Miami, Florida. The band was formed in 2007 by Matt Mehana and former member Nabil Moo. The group signed with Epitaph Records before releasing their debut album, You Can't Spell Slaughter Without Laughter, in 2008. Their second album, Astral Rejection, was originally supposed to be released on June 22, 2010, but the original recording was shelved by Epitaph, and later released on June 21, 2011. Shortly after, Chris Lent also left the band. Their third album, Caterpillar Sex, was announced in 2013 but has since still never seen a release.

History

I Set My Friends on Fire EP (2007–2008)
Matt Mehana and Nabil Moo performed previously in a local band named We Are The Cavalry. After the band disbanded, Mehana and Moo began creating songs under the name I Set My Friends on Fire. Some assumed that the new name was derived from the Aiden song of the same title. However, the group explained they were unaware of this at the time. Mehana has expressed his dismay over fans assuming that they used an Aiden song for their name, stating that Aiden "sucks".  They garnered a large audience due in part to MySpace, where their first single, a rendition of Soulja Boy Tell 'Em's "Crank That (Soulja Boy)" (originally entitled "Crank That Cavalry Boy") received more than one million plays. The duo's MySpace page was removed three times because the MySpace staff believed that the duo were using software to increase the song's play count. The band released a self-titled EP before releasing their first album. The EP features the songs "Crank That", "ASL", and "Beauty Is in the Eye of the Beerholder".

You Can't Spell Slaughter Without Laughter (2008–2009)
The duo then signed to Epitaph Records, which released their debut album You Can't Spell Slaughter Without Laughter on October 7, 2008. The album garnered a negative to mixed reception from various critics. You Can't Spell Slaughter Without Laughter reached number 29 on the Billboard Top Heatseekers chart. The song "Things That Rhyme with Orange" was the second single from the album and their third career single.

Works with Smosh (2008–2009)
On November 21, 2008, the comedy duo Smosh had teamed up with I Set My Friends on Fire and released their first music video and second single, called "Sex Ed Rocks" which had over 20 million views. Later in September 2009, they teamed up yet again and released their second music video and fourth single, entitled "Four Years Foreplay" which attracted over 7 million views. "Four Years Foreplay" featured I Set My Friends On Fire's new drummer Chris Lent from From First To Last.

Astral Rejection (2010–2012)
I Set My Friends on Fire entered the studio in early 2010 to write and record their second album. The group performed at The Bamboozle music festival in New Jersey on May 1, 2010, and then entered the studio for a second time on June 2, 2010, to finish their upcoming album. The first single from the album, "Excite Dyke", was released exclusively via digital download on June 15, 2010, as part of a new Epitaph compilation CD entitled "New Noise Vol. 1".

The full album Astral Rejection was released and streamed on ISMFOF's website on June 16, 2011. Astral Rejection was released in stores on June 21, 2011. On July 18, the music video for "It Comes Naturally" was released on YouTube directed by Nicholas Lent and co-founder and ex-member Nabil Moo.

Caterpillar Sex (2013–2017)
In September 2015, Mehana announced that the band had a new line up featuring former members of The Bunny The Bear. In November, the band departed on their first tour in over three years. They toured consistently for the next nine months, playing over 150 shows in 24 countries.

Mehana had started releasing several demos for a new album entitled Caterpillar Sex. These demos showed a much more experimental side, being almost completely electronic with no real drums, and very little guitar. Caterpillar Sex was postponed many times, with Mehana stating that his style kept changing. The album was slated to be released on July 21, 2017, and was expected to contain 24 tracks. Its first single, entitled "The Vision and Scarlet Witch," was released on June 28, 2017.  According to the band's official Facebook page, the album has still gone unreleased, no reason has been given, but issues with their label at the time are a likely culprit.

My Uzi Holds A Hundred Round Conscience (2017)
On December 9, 2016, the band announced on their Facebook page that they have signed to Tragic Hero Records and have released the first single from their upcoming fourth studio album My Uzi Holds A Hundred Round Conscience. A music video was also filmed for the single. The band toured the US, Canada, Europe, and Russia in early 2017. They announced that they were going to be on the first ever Tragic Hero Records Tour as direct support for The Dead Rabbitts in June and July. The album was scheduled for July 21 but had been pushed to Fall due to unforeseen "production issues", as of December 2019 neither this album or Caterpillar Sex have seen release.

10 Years Of Slaughter, fourth record, Original Astral Rejection, Caterpillar Sex update (2018–present)
In January 2018, the band announced that they would be doing a 10 Year anniversary tour for "You Can't Spell Slaughter Without Laughter" called 10 Years Of Slaughter tour. Later that week, the band announced their first leg which covered major cities in the US and also announced Kissing Candice and Awaken I am as support. The tour kicked off on February 15 in Pittsburgh and ended March 16th in Oklahoma City. The tour consisted of multiple festival appearances and headline shows in small clubs, which resulted in most dates selling out.

On March 20, the band announced a second leg of the tour which covered major cities in Canada and cities they had previously missed in the US on the first leg. The next day, the Germany-based Metal band Annisokay was announced as direct support. Red Handed Denial and The Funeral Portrait were then announced as the other support bands on this tour.

In April, the band announced they were in the studio recording the rest of the fourth record.

The band went on to tour Europe in October and released a new single titled "Don't Take Me For Pomegranate" featuring rapper Lil Lotus.

In an interview with DEAD PRESS! while touring the UK in 2018, Mehana shared that Epitaph Records' decision to scrap the original version of their second record Astral Rejection caused tension between him and Moo, and that the stress forced him to leave the band. Mehana was then left to handle the writing duties solo, later recruiting Chris Lent of From First To Last into the line-up.

Reportedly, in the same interview, Mehana stated that Epitaph Records have since been in touch with him with the intention of releasing the originally recorded album officially under the name of "O.G. Astral Rejection" or "Original Astral Rejection".

On March 7, 2019, the band confirmed that the shelved and original version of Astral Rejection would get an official release through Epitaph Records on March 29, 2019.

The band has stated that they currently don't have tour plans in the works but they were hoping to tour sometime before the end of 2019. This didn't happen, however.

In May 2019, the band released a mini EP in collaboration with rapper Lil Lotus, entitled Online Now.

On August 19, 2019, the band made a post on Instagram confirming that Caterpillar Sex did still exist and it was seemingly in the finishing stages of production, meaning they could've been redoing it for all of these years, there's a possibility of a 2020 release.

Musical style

I Set My Friends on Fire is recognized for their experimental musical style. The group blends elements from a variety of genres including electronica, crunkcore, post-hardcore, metalcore, electronicore, alternative metal, screamo, dance-pop, mathcore, and glitch. AllMusic describes the group's style as "a tornado of musical influences and genres".

Band members

Current members
Matt Mehanalead vocals (2007–present), keyboards, programming (2010–present)
 Nate Blasdell lead guitar, backing vocals, keyboards, programming (2014–present), bass (2014–2016), drums (2014–2015, 2016), rhythm guitar (2014–2015, 2017)
 Chris Thompsondrums (2016–present)
 Connor Mitchenerbass (2016–present)
 Jimmy Bennett rhythm guitar (2018, 2022–present)

Former members
 Nabil Moolead guitar, keyboards, backing vocals, bass, sequencer, programming (2007–2010), drums (2007–2009)
 Chris Lentdrums (2009–2011), lead guitar, keyboards, sequencer (2010–2011) 
 Josh Millerdrums (2015-2016)
 Jonathan Rosellrhythm guitar (2015-2017), bass (2015-2016)
 Hector Bagnod rhythm guitar (2017–2022)

Touring members

 Evan Fortgangguitar (2022-present)
 Kane Buckley guitar (2016-2017), bass (2016)
 Cody Wagnerdrums (2016)
 Blake Steinerlead guitar (2010-2011)
 Evan PerryDJ (2011)
 Ashton Howarthrhythm guitar (2011)
 Andrew Tapleyrhythm guitar, bass (2011)
 Matt Mingusdrums (2012)
 Joe Nelsonlead guitar, backing vocals (2011-2012)
 Airick Delgadorhythm guitar (2012)
 August Bartelldrums (2012)

Discography

Studio albums and extended plays

Singles

* these are possible songs to be released on this album, but are not verified

Music videos

References

External links
 Official Myspace
 Epitaph Records
 

2007 establishments in Florida
Electronic music duos
Electronic music groups from Florida
Epitaph Records artists
Musical groups established in 2007
Musical groups from Miami
Musical quintets
Tragic Hero Records artists
American experimental musical groups
American experimental rock groups
American post-hardcore musical groups
Metalcore musical groups from Florida